The Martyrs Foundation is a governmental institution of the Iraqi Council of Ministers, established in 2005. Its mission is to deal with the general situation of the martyrs families and to compensate them materially and morally currently headed by Najeha Abdul-Amer al- Shemary.

See also
Politics of Iraq

References

External links
 Official Website

Politics of Iraq
Government of Iraq
Institutions of the Iraqi Council of Ministers